Cora Westland (born 28 October 1962) is a Dutch former cyclist. She competed in the women's individual road race at the 1988 Summer Olympics.

References

External links
 

1962 births
Living people
Dutch female cyclists
Olympic cyclists of the Netherlands
Cyclists at the 1988 Summer Olympics
People from Bussum
Cyclists from North Holland
20th-century Dutch women